Joe Forzani (born June 30, 1945) is a former Canadian football player who played for the Calgary Stampeders. He won the Grey Cup with them in 1971. He played college football at Utah State University. Joe and two of his brothers, John and Tom, all played together with the Calgary Stampeders. John and Tom also attended Utah State University.

References

1945 births
Living people
Calgary Stampeders players
Utah State Aggies football players
American football linebackers
Canadian football linebackers
Canadian players of American football
Players of Canadian football from Alberta
Canadian football people from Calgary